is a railway station in the city of Nasushiobara, Tochigi, Japan, operated by the East Japan Railway Company (JR East).

Lines

Station layout
This station has one side platform and two island platforms serving a total of five tracks. The platforms are connected to the station building by a footbridge. The station has a Midori no Madoguchi staffed ticket office.

Platforms

History
Kuroiso Station began operation on December 1, 1886, as a station of Nippon Railway. The Nippon Railway was nationalized on November 1, 1906, and the station became a JGR station From June 1, 1949, the station came under the control of the JNR. The portion of the Utsunomiya Line from Hōshakuji - Kuroiso was electrified (1.5 kV DC) on May 22, 1959, and the section from Kuroiso - Shiroishi was electrified (20 kV 50 Hz AC) on July 1, 1959. With the privatization of JNR on April 1, 1987, the station came under the control of JR East.

The dead section between AC and DC electrification section was just located within this station. Trains drag by electric locomotive should change to AC-powered locomotive for northern bound, or DC-powered for southern, and electric multiple units require dropping pantograph when changing the power. This electric-changing system is hard to maintain, and in 2008 a maintenance worker was killed by electric shock. In 2013, JR East decided to change power lines in this station to be purely DC-powered. The renovation of power system has changed since then, and on 1 January 2018, the dead section has re-located at a place near bridge northern of the station.

Passenger statistics
In fiscal 2019, the station was used by an average of 2316 passengers daily (boarding passengers only).

Surrounding area
The station, located in the former city of Kuroiso, sits in front of a street lined with several local cafes and businesses. Having a bus terminal, it also serves as a gateway to the neighboring town of Nasu, known in Japan for its mountain hot springs and as the location of the Nasu Imperial Villa.

See also
 List of railway stations in Japan

References

External links

 JR East station information 

Railway stations in Tochigi Prefecture
Tōhoku Main Line
Utsunomiya Line
Railway stations in Japan opened in 1886
Nasushiobara
Stations of East Japan Railway Company